The Embassy of Vietnam in London is the diplomatic mission of Vietnam in the United Kingdom. Vietnam also maintains a Commercial Section at 108 Campden Hill Road, Holland Park.

Gallery

References

External links
Official site

Vietnam
Diplomatic missions of Vietnam
United Kingdom–Vietnam relations
Buildings and structures in the Royal Borough of Kensington and Chelsea
South Kensington